The Pike Creek, a perennial stream that is one of the Border Rivers and part of the Macintyre catchment within the Murray–Darling basin, is located in the Darling Downs region of Queensland, Australia

The creek flows generally west and then south, through the Glenlyon Dam and joined by nine minor tributaries before reaching its confluence with the Mole River to form the Dumaresq River. The creek descends  over its  course.

See also

References

Rivers of Queensland
Darling Downs
Murray-Darling basin
Southern Downs Region